Is There Really a Mind? is a 2022 limited-edition fundraiser album by American experimental rock band Swans. The album was released in February 2022 on band leader Michael Gira's Young God Records. Limited to 2,500 copies, Is There Really a Mind? serves as a fundraiser for the forthcoming sixteenth Swans album, which is slated for recording in April 2022 and release in early 2023.

Background
After the tour for Swans' 2019 album Leaving Meaning was canceled due to the COVID-19 pandemic, Gira decided to refocus on creating a new album, which resulted in the ten songs found on Is There Really a Mind? In the liner notes of this release, Gira describes these recordings as "rough, preliminary versions (of most) of the songs that will appear on the upcoming Swans album. These recordings are intended for your ears only as a gesture of appreciation for your support of the music, and as a way to raise funds to make the recording and production of the album as nuanced and fully realized as possible."

Track listing

Notes
 "No More of This" is not listed on the liner notes
 When originally announced, the demo sessions included tracks titled "My Phantom Limb (Revised)" and "You Will Pay", the latter of which was also planned for Swans' previous 2019 fundraiser album, What Is This?

Personnel
Credits adapted from Is There Really a Mind? liner notes
Michael Gira – words, music, recording, liner notes, design concept
Little Mikey – additional vocals and percussion (track 7)
Ingo Krauss – mastering
Nicole Boitos – artwork

References

External links
Is There Really a Mind? on Young God Records

Crowdfunded albums
Albums produced by Michael Gira
2022 albums
Young God Records albums
Demo albums